La Mano (Spanish for The Hand; also: La Mano/Nami) is a graffiti artist based in Barcelona, who often paints a large hand. Unlike almost every noun ending in "o" in Spanish, it is feminine.

References

Further reading
Ekosystem Gallery
 
 Manco, Tristan: Street Logos. Thames & Hudson, 2004, .

Spanish graffiti artists